56a Infoshop is a self-managed social centre, archive, and shop based in Elephant and Castle, Southwark, London. Its collection centres around left and far-left materials including information on anarchism, anti-gentrification, to squatting.

History
56a Infoshop was founded in 1991 initially as a squat and a self-managed social centre. From here, it eventually had to accept an agreement in 2003 to pay a "peppercorn" rent by Southwark Council to remain functional within the area.

Services 
The infoshop offers mixed, volunteered services from selling books, book exchanges, free bike workshops, squatter workshops, free meeting spaces, and a open-access archival collection.

Collection 
56a Infoshop's collection of over 50,000 items (2021) focuses on collecting left and far-left radicial and anarchical materials ranging from books, leaflets, magazines, maps, pamphlets posters, zines, and other print material. Their collection mainly spans items from the 1980s up to the present day with an active focus on conserving ongoing, although they have materials touching on subjects as early as the 14th century.

They have an ongoing digitisation effort through their online catalogue and take on scan-a-thons to preserve collection material. External partners including other archival spaces like MayDay rooms. 56a Infoshop also operates the online resources Southwark Notes that "is a campaigning group and research project concerned with the impact of the regeneration and gentrification of Southwark".

Governance 
The infoshop is run by volunteers, largely unfunded, and presents an informal, DIY archival and resource space.

References

External links
 56a Infoshop website 
 Catalogue

Charities based in London
Literary archives in London
Archives in the London Borough of Southwark
Socialist organizations
Socialist organisations in the United Kingdom
1991 establishments in the United Kingdom
Infoshops
Squats in the United Kingdom
Legalized squats